Niki Spiridakos is a Canadian actress.

Filmography
Dropped Frames (2004) as Lori Lane
Grub (2005; video) as Kuda
Real Premonition (2007) as Debbie
Agenda (2007) as Luna
Blonde Ambition (2007) (credited as Nikki Spiridakos) as Nikolina
Hallows Point (2007) as Becky
Throwing Stars (also known as Who's Your Monkey?) (2007) as Jillian
Euphoria (2009; short film) as Blue Girl
The Pardon (2009) as Niki
RoboDoc (2009) as Pontangpoo
The Yank (2014) as Vanessa
Moontrap: Target Earth (2014) as Mya
One Year Off (TBA)

References

External links

American film actresses
Living people
21st-century American actresses
Year of birth missing (living people)